The Turmoil may refer to:

 The Turmoil, a 1915 novel by Booth Tarkington
 The Turmoil (1916 film), an American silent film based on the novel
 The Turmoil (1924 film), an American silent film based on the novel

See also
 Turmoil (disambiguation)